Pai or PAI may refer to:

People
 Pai (surname), Indian surname from coastal Karnataka and Goa plus people with the name
 Pai (Chinese surname), includes Chinese name origin, plus people with the name

Fictional characters
 Pai (Manga character), a character from "3x3 Eyes"
 Pie (Tokyo Mew Mew), a villain from the manga and anime series Tokyo Mew Mew

Places
 Pai, Iran, a village in Isfahan Province
 Pai, Thailand, a small town in Mae Hong Son Province
 Pai District, the district around the town
 Pai River
 Pai Airport
Pai, Tank, a union council in Pakistan
Pai Northern Thai Kitchen, a restaurant chain in Toronto, Canada

Games
 Gwat Pai, Chinese dominoes set
 Zi pai, Chinese card game
 Pai Gow, Chinese gambling game
 Pai gow poker, Americanized version

Other uses
 Pai languages (Paipai, Walapai, Havasupai)
 Pai dialect of the Northern Sotho language
 Pai (fish trap)
 "Pai", a 2016 song by Bad Gyal

Acronyms
 PAI Partners, a French private equity firm
 PAI (Personal Activity Intelligence), a fitness indicator developed by researcher Ulrik Wisløff
 Parachute Association of Ireland, a representative/regulatory body for skydivers in Ireland
 Parti Africain de l’Indépendance (African Independence Party), a former political party in Bourkina Faso
 PartnerAid International, a German-based Christian humanitarian organization
 Pathogenicity island, a distinct class of genomic island which is acquired by horizontal transfer
 Periodic annual increment
 Persatuan Arab Indonesia, an association of Arab Indonesians
 Personality Assessment Inventory, a test given by psychologists
 Photoacoustic imaging
 Plasminogen activator inhibitor-1 (PAI-1), a protein that inhibits fibrinolysis (breakdown of blood clots)
 Plasminogen activator inhibitor-2 (PAI-2), another protein that inhibits fibrinolysis
 Poalei Agudat Yisrael, an Israeli political party
 Polizia dell'Africa Italiana (Italian Police of Africa, police force in the Italian colonies
 Polyamide-imide, a thermoplastic polymer
 Polyatomic ion
 Population Action International
 Primary adrenal insufficiency (primary adrenocortical insufficiency), that is, Addison's disease, a rare endocrine disorder
Public Accountability Initiative

See also
 Bae (surname)